Cyclosodes is a monotypic moth genus in the family Erebidae. Its single species, Cyclosodes flavicostata, is found on Borneo. Both the genus and species were first described by George Hampson in 1901.

References

Cisthenina
Monotypic moth genera
Moths described in 1901
Moths of Asia